Philippe Camus is a 15th-century French writer who wrote L'Histoire d'Olivier de Castille et Artus d'Algarbe (between 1430 and 1460) as well as a prose version of Adenet le Roi's romance Cleomadés.

References
 Comprehensive bibliography on Arlima (Archives de littérature du Moyen Âge)

15th-century French novelists
15th-century French writers
French male novelists